Honolua Bay, Mokuleia Bay and Lipoa Point are part of an area known as the ahupuaʻa of Honolua, located just north of Kapalua, West Maui in Maui County, Hawaii, United States. The area is a mix of agricultural and conservation land tended by the Maui Land & Pineapple Company in Lahaina, Hawaii, including coastline management. Honolua Bay and Mokuleia Bay comprise the  Honolua-Mokuleia Marine Life Conservation District.

Geography
Honolua is located along the west coast of Maui at  (20.996739, -156.653073).

From Honolua you can view the islands of Molokai and Lanai. Honolua Bay is at the northern end of this area, . Any type of commercial activity without a permit from the Department of Land and Natural Resources OCCL division is illegal.

Recreation and leisure
 
The coastline at Honolua and Mokuleia is rugged and is accessed by trail from a parking lot adjacent to the Honoapiilani Highway above. Mokuleia Bay is home to Slaughterhouse Beach, a sand beach with coral reefs. Honolua Bay consists of a rocky shoreline with small beach, coral reefs in a marine preserve and world-renowned surf break. Honolua Bay hosts the annual Billabong Pipe women's surf competition in December.

References

External links

Surfline Report of Honolua Bay
Caring for Honolua 
Save Honolua Coalition
Honolua Advisory Council

Maui